Metaxanthia threnodes is a moth of the family Erebidae first described by Herbert Druce in 1905. It is found in Suriname, Venezuela and French Guiana.

References

 

Phaegopterina
Moths described in 1905